Yi Long, birth name Liu Xingjun, is a Chinese martial artist, kickboxer and Wushu and other martial arts practitioner who competes in the Super Welterweight, Welterweight and Super Middleweight divisions.

Born in Dezhou, Shandong, Yi is self-trained in Shaolin Kung Fu.

He was the 2007 Guangdong Foshan International Wing Chun champion.

In the summer of 2009, he began to fight in Wu Lin Feng.

Yi Long previously had called himself the "number 1 Shaolin Kung Fu Monk" despite the Shaolin temple claiming the fighter is unaffiliated with them in 2010.

Championships and awards 
 2013 Wu Lin Feng World champion
 2015 WCK World Champion
 2014 S-1 Muaythai Super Middleweight World champion
 2014 Wu Lin Feng World champion -73.5 kg
 2012 CIK World Champion

Kickboxing record 

|- style="background:#cfc;"
| 2021-10-30
| Win
| align="left" | Ayoub Faiz 
| Wu Lin Feng 2021: WLF on Haihua Island
| Danzhou, China 
| KO
| 1
| 
|-
|- style="background:#cfc;"
| 2018-11-10
| Win
| align="left" | Choi Hong-man 
| MAS FIGHT
| Macau, China 
| TKO
| 1
| 0:30
|-
|- style="background:#fbb;"
| 2018-06-02
| Loss
| align="left" | Saiyok Pumpanmuang 
| Wu Lin Feng 2018: Yi Long VS Saiyok
| Chongqing, China 
| KO (Left High Kick + Right Hook)
| 1
| 2:30
|-
|- style="background:#fbb;"
| 2017-11-04
| Loss
| align="left" | Sitthichai Sitsongpeenong 
| Wu Lin Feng 2017: Yi Long VS Sitthichai
| Kunming, China 
| KO (Left High Kick)
| 2
| 1:10
|-
! style=background:white colspan=9 |
|-
|- style="background:#cfc;"
| 2017-04-30 
| Win 
| align="left" | Yoshida 
| Wu Xing Feng Yun 
| Weifang, China
| KO 
| 2 
| 
|- style="background:#cfc;"
| 2017-01-14 
| Win 
| align="left" | Marco Piqué 
| Wu Lin Feng World Kickboxing Championship 2017
| Zhengzhou, China 
| Decision 
| 3 
| 3:00
|-
|- style="background:#cfc;"
| 2016-11-05 
| Win 
| align="left" | Buakaw Banchamek 
| Wu Lin Feng 2016: Fight of the Century 2
| Nanjing, China 
| Decision 
| 3 
| 3:00 
|-
! style=background:white colspan=9 |
|- style="background:#cfc;"
| 2016-09-10 
| Win 
| align="left" | Masato Uchiyama 
| Wu Lin Feng 2016: World Kickboxing Championship in Shenzhen 
| Shenzhen, China 
| Decision 
| 3 
| 3:00
|-
|- style="background:#cfc;"
| 2016-08-27 
| Win 
| align="left" | Franz Sanchez 
| Wu Lin Feng 2016: China vs Australia
| Sydney, Australia 
| TKO 
| 1 
| 
|-
|- style="background:#cfc;"
| 2016-04-02 
| Win 
| align="left" | Enriko Kehl 
| Glory of Heroes 1 
| Shenzhen, China 
| Decision 
| 3 
| 3:00 
|-
|- style="background:#cfc;"
| 2016-01-31 
| Win 
| align="left" | Rda Mi 
| Heroes of Changbai Mountain 
| Changbai Mountain, Jilin, China
| Decision 
| 3 
| 3:00
|-
|- style="background:#cfc;"
| 2016-01-23 
| Win 
| align="left" | Seyedisa Alamdarnezam 
| Wu Lin Feng 2016: World Kickboxing Championship in Shanghai
| Shanghai, China 
| Decision 
| 3 
| 3:00
|-
|- style="background:#cfc;"
| 2015-11-14 
| Win 
| align="left" | Raul Rodriguez 
| Wu Lin Feng 2015: China VS USA 
| Las Vegas, US
| KO 
| 2 
| 
|-
|- style="background:#cfc;"
| 2015-08-22 
| Win 
| align="left" | Kai Chee 
| 2015 in Wu Lin Feng
| Xiamen, China 
| KO 
| 2 
| 
|-
|- style="background:#cfc;"
| 2015-08-08 
| Win 
| align="left" | 
| 2015 in Wu Lin Feng 
| Chengdu, China 
| Decision 
| 3 
| 3:00 
|-
|- style="background:#cfc;"
| 2015-07-11 
| Win 
| align="left" | Koizumi Ryu 
| 2015 in Wu Lin Feng 
| Zhumadian, China
| Decision 
| 3 
| 3:00 
|-
|- style="background:#fbb;"
| 2015-06-06 
| Loss 
| align="left" | Buakaw Banchamek 
| Wu Lin Feng 2015 –Fight of the Century 
| Jiyuan, China 
| Decision 
| 3 
| 3:00 
|-
! style=background:white colspan=9 |
|-
|- style="background:#fbb;"
| 2015-04-18 
| Loss
| align="left" | Leo Bönniger 
| 2015 in Wu Lin Feng 
| Germany
| Decision 
| 3 
| 3:00 
|-
|- style="background:#cfc;"
| 2015-04-16 
| Win 
| align="left" | 
| 2015 in Wu Lin Feng 
| China
| KO 
| 2 
| 
|-
|- style="background:#cfc;"
| 2015-03-07 
| Win 
| align="left" | Miguel Varela 
| 2015 in Wu Lin Feng 
| Zhengzhou, China
| Decision 
| 3 
| 3:00 
|-
|- style="background:#c5d2ea;"
| 2015-01-31 
| Draw 
| align="left" | Yuichiro Nagashima 
| 2015 in Wu Lin Feng 
| Chongqing, China
| Decision 
| 3 
| 3:00 
|-
|- style="background:#cfc;"
| 2014-12-31 
| Win 
| align="left" | Kimama Okura 
| 2014 in Wu Lin Feng 
| Yining, China
| Decision 
| 3 
| 3:00 
|-
|- style="background:#cfc;"
| 2014-12-19 
| Win 
| align="left" | Pettong Leamtanawat 
| 2014 in Wu Lin Feng
| Weinan, China
| KO 
| 1 
| 
|-
! style=background:white colspan=9 |
|- style="background:#fbb;"
| 2014-12-09 
| Loss 
| align="left" | Pettong Leamtanawat 
| 2014 in Wu Lin Feng&King's birthday 
| Bangkok, Thailand 
| Decision 
| 3 
| 3:00 
|-
|- style="background:#cfc;"
| 2014-09-28
| Win
| align="left" | Kotaro Mori
| 2014 in Wu Lin Feng
|Hong Kong, China
| KO
| 1
| 
|- style="background:#fbb;"
| 2014-09-09 
| Loss 
| align="left" | Yuichiro Nagashima 
| 2014 in Wu Lin Feng 
| Khorgos, China 
| TKO (Retirement)
| 2
| 
|-
|- style="background:#cfc;"
| 2014-09-07 
| Win 
| align="left" | Dimitri Mason 
| 2014 in Wu Lin Feng 
| Karamay, China
| Decision 
| 3 
| 3:00 
|-
|-
|- style="background:#cfc;"
| 2014-08-19 
| Win 
| align="left" | Jason Ganstantin 
| 2014 in Wu Lin Feng 
| Jining, China
| Decision 
| 3 
| 3:00 
|-
|- style="background:#cfc;"
| 2014-08-09 
| Win 
| align="left" | Mohammed Hansen 
| 2014 in Wu Lin Feng 
| Enshi, China
| KO 
| 1 
| 
|-
|- style="background:#cfc;"
| 2014-07-12 
| Win 
| align="left" | David Brown 
| 2014 in Wu Lin Feng 
| Dublin, Ireland
| KO 
| 3 
| 
|-
|- style="background:#fbb;"
| 2014-05-24 
| Loss 
| align="left" | Sudsakorn Sor Klinmee 
| Yokkao 9 
| Xinyang, China
| Decision 
| 3 
| 3:00 
|-
|- style="background:#cfc;"
| 2014-05-10 
| Win 
| align="left" | Ollie Koch 
| 2014 in Wu Lin Feng 
| Hamburg, Germany
| Decision 
| 3 
| 3:00 
|-
|- style="background:#cfc;"
| 2014-04-19 
| Win 
| align="left" | Karl Counsell 
| 2014 in Wu Lin Feng 
| Kunming, China
| KO 
| 3 
| 
|-
|- style="background:#cfc;"
| 2014-03-30 
| Win 
| align="left" | Choi Woo-yeong 
| Kunlun Fight 3 
| Harbin, China
| Decision 
| 3 
| 3:00 
|-
|- style="background:#cfc;"
| 2014-03-07 
| Win 
| align="left" | 
| 2014 in Wu Lin Feng 
| Hangzhou, China
| KO 
| 1 
| 
|-
|- style="background:#cfc;"
| 2014-02-08 
| Win 
| align="left" | Jackson Alves
| 2014 in Wu Lin Feng 
| Anyang, China
| Decision 
| 3 
| 3:00 
|-
|- style="background:#cfc;"
| 2014-01-19 
| Win 
| align="left" | 
| 2014 in Wu Lin Feng 
| Hefei, China
| KO 
| 2 
| 
|-
|- style="background:#cfc;"
| 2014-01-18 
| Win 
| align="left" | Adrien Grotte 
| 2014 in Wu Lin Feng 
| Xiangyang, China
| KO 
| 1 
| 
|-
|- style="background:#cfc;"
| 2013-11-22 
| Win 
| align="left" | Mike 
| 2013 in Wu Lin Feng 
| Langfang, China
| KO 
| 1 
| 
|-
|- style="background:#cfc;"
| 2013-11-03 
| Win 
| align="left" | Cyrus Washington 
| 2013 in Wu Lin Feng 
| Las Vegas, USA
| Decision 
| 3 
| 3:00 
|-
|- style="background:#cfc;"
| 2013-10-18 
| Win 
| align="left" | Nishizuka Hirohito 
| 2013 in Wu Lin Feng 
| Luoyang, China
| KO 
| 2 
| 
|-
|- style="background:#cfc;"
| 2013-09-07 
| Win 
| align="left" | Paul 
| 2013 in Wu Lin Feng 
| Hami, China
| KO 
| 1 
| 
|-
|- style="background:#cfc;"
| 2013-08-24 
| Win 
| align="left" | 
| 2013 in Wu Lin Feng 
| Zhengzhou, China
| KO 
| 3 
| 
|-
|- style="background:#cfc;"
| 2013-06-18 
| Win 
| align="left" | Jamnian Srikam 
| 2013 in Wu Lin Feng 
| Dubai, UAE
| KO 
| 1 
| 
|-
|- style="background:#fbb;"
| 2013-05-25 
| Loss
| align="left" | Jackson
| 2013 in Wu Lin Feng 
| Wuhu, China
| Decision 
| 3 
| 3:00 
|-
|- style="background:#cfc;"
| 2013-04-28 
| Win 
| align="left" | Nishizuka Hirohito 
| 2013 in Wu Lin Feng 
| Luoyang, China
| Decision 
| 3 
| 3:00 
|-
|- style="background:#cfc;"
| 2013-02-08 
| Win 
| align="left" | Young Jin Min 
| Wu Lin Feng VS Khan
| Seoul, South Korea
| KO 
| 2 
| 
|-
|- style="background:#cfc;"
| 2012-12-31 
| Win 
| align="left" | 
| 2012 in Wu Lin Feng 
| Beijing, China
| Decision 
| 3 
| 3:00 
|-
|- style="background:#fbb;"
| 2012-11-12 
| Loss 
| align="left" | Josh Pickthall 
| 2012 in Wu Lin Feng 
| Las Vegas, United States 
| KO 
| 2 
| 
|-
|- style="background:#cfc;"
| 2012-10-20 
| Win 
| align="left" | Jordan Tai 
| 2012 in Wu Lin Feng 
| Henan, China
| Decision 
| 3 
| 3:00 
|-
|- style="background:#cfc;"
| 2012-06-24 
| Win 
| align="left" | Brad Riddell
| 2012 in Wu Lin Feng 
| Henan, China
| Decision 
| 3 
| 3:00 
|-
! style=background:white colspan=9 |
|-
|- style="background:#cfc;"
| 2012-05-28 
| Win 
| align="left" | Florian Kröger
| 2012 in Wu Lin Feng 
| Hamburg, Germany
| Ex.R Decision 
| 4 
| 3:00 
|-
|- style="background:#cfc;"
| 2012-05-18 
| Win 
| align="left" | Nkata 
| 2012 in Wu Lin Feng 
| Anhui, China
| Decision 
| 3 
| 3:00 
|- style="background:#fbb;"
| 2012-04-03 
| Loss 
| align="left" | Masato Uchiyama 
| 2012 in Wu Lin Feng 
| Henan, China 
| Decision 
| 3 
| 3:00 
|-
|- style="background:#cfc;"
| 2012-01-14 
| Win 
| align="left" | Brad Riddell
| 2012 in Wu Lin Feng 
| Henan, China
| Decision 
| 3 
| 3:00 
|-
|- style="background:#cfc;"
| 2011-12-20 
| Win 
| align="left" | Hideaki Yoshikawa 
| 2011 in Wu Lin Feng 
| China
| Decision 
| 3 
| 3:00 
|-
|- style="background:#fbb;"
| 2011-12-02 
| Loss 
| align="left" | Brad Riddell 
| 2011 in Wu Lin Feng 
| Henan, China 
| Decision 
| 3 
| 3:00 
|-
|- style="background:#cfc;"
| 2011-11-12 
| Win 
| align="left" | Sin Ili 
| 2011 in Wu Lin Feng
| Las Vegas, United States
| KO 
| 2 
| 
|-
|- style="background:#cfc;"
| 2011-10-15 
| Win 
| align="left" | 
| 2011 in Wu Lin Feng 
| Kuala Lumpur, Malaysia
| Decision 
| 3 
| 3:00 
|-
|- style="background:#cfc;"
| 2011-08-16 
| Win 
| align="left" | Yoshi Jukichi
| 2011 in Wu Lin Feng
| China
| KO 
| 1 
| 
|-
|- style="background:#cfc;"
| 2011-06-14 
| Win 
| align="left" | Keith Petit 
| 2011 in Wu Lin Feng China VS USA
| China
| KO 
| 2 
| 
|-
|- style="background:#cfc;"
| 2011-05-20 
| Win 
| align="left" | 
| 2011 in Wu Lin Feng
| China
| KO 
| 1 
| 
|-
|- style="background:#fbb;"
| 2010-11-14 
| Loss 
| align="left" | Adrien Grotte 
| 2010 in Wu Lin Feng 
| Las Vegas, United States 
| KO 
| 2 
| 
|-
|- style="background:#cfc;"
| 2010-11-07 
| Win 
| align="left" | Pan Guoshui 
| 2010 in Wu Lin Feng 
| China
| Decision 
| 3 
| 3:00 
|-
|- style="background:#cfc;"
| 2010-08-14 
| Win 
| align="left" | Sonchai Me.mai 
| 2010 in Wu Lin Feng 
| China
| Decision 
| 3 
| 3:00 
|-
|- style="background:#cfc;"
| 2010-06-19 
| Win 
| align="left" | Sonchai Me.mai 
| 2010 in Wu Lin Feng 
| China
| Decision 
| 3 
| 3:00 
|-
|- style="background:#cfc;"
| 2010-05-01 
| Win 
| align="left" | David Hayes 
| 2010 in Wu Lin Feng 
| Henan, China
| Decision 
| 3 
| 3:00 
|-
|- style="background:#cfc;"
| 2009-12-31 
| Win 
| align="left" | Gustin Turi 
| 2009 in Wu Lin Feng 
| China
| Decision 
| 3 
| 3:00 
|-
|- style="background:#cfc;"
| 2009-11 
| Win 
| align="left" | Jin Hongyu 
| 2009 in Wu Lin Feng 
| China
| Decision 
| 5 
| 2:00 
|-
|- style="background:#cfc;"
| 2009-10 
| Win 
| align="left" | Zhang Chong 
| 2009 in Wu Lin Feng 
| China
| Decision 
| 5 
| 2:00 
|-
|- style="background:#cfc;"
| 2009-09 
| Win 
| align="left" | Gantavlov Anton 
| 2009 in Wu Lin Feng 
| China
| Decision 
| 5 
| 2:00 
|-
|- style="background:#cfc;"
| 2009-09 
| Win 
| align="left" | Wang Yanxin 
| 2009 in Wu Lin Feng 
| China
| Decision 
| 5 
| 2:00 
|-
|- style="background:#cfc;"
| 2009-09 
| Win 
| align="left" | Yang Zhenbin 
| 2009 in Wu Lin Feng 
| China
| Decision 
| 5 
| 2:00 
|-
|- style="background:#cfc;"
| 2009-08 
| Win 
| align="left" | Hao Zuoqiong 
| 2009 in Wu Lin Feng 
| China
| Decision 
| 5 
| 2:00 
|-
|- style="background:#cfc;"
| 2009-08 
| Win 
| align="left" | Hou Kuizhong 
| 2009 in Wu Lin Feng 
| China
| Decision 
| 5 
| 2:00 
|-
|- style="background:#cfc;"
| 2009-07-18 
| Win 
| align="left" | Wang Zhiliang 
| 2009 in Wu Lin Feng 
| China
| Decision 
| 5 
| 2:00 
|-
| colspan=9 | Legend:

Filmography

Films 
Copper Skin Iron Bone (2019)
 Chinatown War (2019)
 Chinese Peacekeeping Forces (2019)
 Captain America : Civil War (2016)
Boxing Champion (2017)
 The Dream of My Director (2015)

References 

Chinese male kickboxers
Welterweight kickboxers
Chinese wushu practitioners
1987 births
Living people